Vadim Yevgenyevich Boyko was a colonel in the Russian military and deputy director of the Makarov Pacific Higher Naval School in Vladivostok. Boyko had been responsible for working with Russian soldiers drafted under Putin's  September 21 mobilization order during the Russian invasion of Ukraine.

Russian media outlet Dalnevostochnie Novosti reported that Boyko had committed suicide, but when he was found dead there were five bullet casings and four pistols next to his body. A post on the Baza Telegram channel stated: "It turns out that the colonel shot himself in the chest five times."

Boyko's death came after several apparent suicide deaths of Russian oligarchs and the disappearance or illness of Russian military men following the invasion of Ukraine.

References

2022 deaths
Deaths by firearm
Russian military personnel of the 2022 Russian invasion of Ukraine
Russian military personnel who committed suicide
Date of birth missing
Place of birth missing
Year of birth missing